Samuel Chan Sze Ming is a Hong Kong education consultant and columnist. He is the founder of Britannia StudyLink. Chan was named one of Prestige Magazine's "40 Under 40" in 2020, in recognition of the ways in which he has helped to improve the education industry in Hong Kong. 

In 2017, Chan was awarded the Entrepreneurial Award by the British Council in Hong Kong for helping "to bring transparency to the UK school placement sector and standardise UK independent school applications through the introduction of the testing system, UKiset, to Hong Kong".

Media 
Chan has appeared on different media platforms, both as a guest and host.

Radio

TV

SPARK Festival 
In January 2019, Chan participated in SPARK, Hong Kong's first festival of ideas. SPARK: The Science and Art of Creativity, was run by the British Council and attracted more than 14,000 visitors to Tai Kwun Centre, bringing together artists, scientists and academics from Hong Kong and the UK. Chan hosted a panel discussion on "Promoting 21st Century Skills in the Future Workforce" which included former Financial Secretary John Tsang.

References

Year of birth missing (living people)
Living people
Hong Kong journalists
Alumni of the University of Nottingham
Alumni of the University of Warwick